Olga Olehivna Babiy (born 20 June 1989),  Kalinina, is a Ukrainian chess player who holds the FIDE title of Woman Grandmaster (WGM, 2013).

Chess career
In 2009 she won Ukrainian girls' championship in the age category U20. In the same year in Yevpatoria she won bronze medal in the Ukrainian women's chess championship. In 2011 in Shenzhen she played for Ukrainian student national team in the 2011 Summer Universiade and won team silver medal. In 2015 in Lviv she won silver medal in the Ukrainian women's chess championship.

In 2008, she was awarded the FIDE Woman International Master (WIM) title and received the FIDE Woman Grandmaster (WGM) title five years later.

References

External links
 
 
 

1989 births
Living people
Ukrainian female chess players
Chess woman grandmasters
Sportspeople from Ternopil